Nado may refer to:

People
 Dez Nado hip hop and reggae singer, writer and producer
 Iddy Nado (born 1995), Tanzanian football player
 Nado Makhmudov (1907–1990), Kurdish writer
 Stéphane Nado (born 1972), French football coach and player

Other
 NADO, national anti-doping organisations